Magnús Blöndal Jóhannsson (8 September 1925 - 1 January 2005) was an Icelandic composer, pianist and conductor.

Jóhannsson studied with Franz Mixa and Victor Urbancic at the Reykjavík College of Music (1935–7, 1939–45) and with Bernard Wagenaar and Marion Bauer at the Juilliard School (1947–53). He was active as répétiteur and conductor at the Icelandic National Theater (1956–61), and was a producer at the Icelandic State Broadcasting Service (RÚV) until 1974;

Jóhannsson was also a founder member of Musica Nova in 1959. After a period in the United States, (1977–87), he took up residence again in Iceland.

In the 1950s and early 60s, Jóhannsson was at the forefront of the Icelandic avant garde. His Fjórar abstraksjónir  (‘'Four Abstractions’', 1950) for piano was the first Icelandic 12-note composition; he was also a pioneer in electronic music, composing his Elektrónísk stúdía for woodwind quintet, piano and tape in 1958.

In 1971 Jóhannsson stopped composing for almost a decade; this extended silence was eventually broken with his Adagio (1980) for strings, celesta and percussion, which marks a significant stylistic shift in his music. Like the works which followed, it abandons his earlier experimental style for a more simple, neo-romantic lyricism.

In 1995 Jóhannson handed over his works to the National and University Library of Iceland for preservation.

References 

Icelandic composers